Štoky is a market town in Havlíčkův Brod District in the Vysočina Region of the Czech Republic. It has about 2,000 inhabitants.

Administrative parts
Villages of Petrovice, Pozovice, Smilov and Studénka are administrative parts of Štoky.

Notable people
Jaroslav Rössler (1902–1990), photographer

References

Populated places in Havlíčkův Brod District
Market towns in the Czech Republic